The Bass-ic Collection is a Stanley Clarke compilation album released in 1997.

Track listing
All tracks composed by Stanley Clarke, except where indicated.

 "School Days" – 7:49
 "Wild Dog" (Clarke, George Duke) - 3:31
 "We Supply" (Clarke, Louis Johnson) -	4:11
 "Mothership Connection (Star Child)" (Bernie Worrell, Bootsy Collins, George Clinton) - 4:16
 "Journey to Love" – 4:42
 "Hello Jeff" – 5:14
 "I Wanna Play for You" – 5:13
 "Silly Putty" – 4:40
 "Hot Fun" – 2:30
 "Rock 'n' Roll Jelly" – 5:06
 "Jamaican Boy" – 3:26
 "Lost in a Thought" – 5:11
 "Between Love and Magic" – 4:09
 "Life Suite" – 8:59

Personnel
 Stanley Clarke – bass
 Brandon Fields – tenor saxophone
 Kirk Whalum – tenor saxophone
 Jerry Hey – trumpet
 George Bohanon – trombone
 Todd Cochran – organ
 George Duke – piano, keyboards, vocals, rap
 David Sancious – guitar, keyboards
 Jeff Beck – guitar
 Ray Gomez – guitar
 Louis Johnson – bass, vocals
 Steve Gadd – drums
 Tony Williams – drums
 Darryl Brown – drums
 Carmine Appice – drums
 Dennis Chambers – drums
 Harvey Mason – drums
 John "J.R." Robinson – drums
 Gerry Brown – drums, handbells
 Phil Perry – vocals, rap
 Philip Bailey – vocals, rap
 Leon "Ndugu" Chancler – vocals, rap
 Carl Carwell – vocals, rap
 Darrell Cox – vocals, rap
 Dee Dee Bridgewater – background vocals

Brass
 Al Aarons – brass
 Stewart Blumberg – brass
 Garnett Brown – brass
 James Buffington – brass
 Buddy Childers – brass
 Jon Faddis – brass
 Robert Findley – brass
 Peter Gordon – brass
 Gary Grant – brass
 Lew McCreary – brass
 Jack Nimitz – brass
 William Peterson – brass
 Dalton Smith – brass
 Lew Soloff – brass
 Dave Taylor – brass

Strings
 Marilyn Baker – strings
 Carol Buck – strings
 Thomas Buffum – strings
 David Campbell – strings
 Harry Cykman – strings
 Rollice Dale – strings
 Robert Dubow – strings
 Paul Gershman – strings
 Emanuel Green – strings
 Karen Jones – strings
 Dennis Karmazyn – strings
 Harold Kohon – strings
 Beverly Lauridsen – strings
 Jesse Levy – strings
 Gordon Marron – strings
 Lya Stern – strings
 John Wittenberg – strings

Production
 Ken Scott – producer
 Brian Gardner – mastering

References

1997 albums
Stanley Clarke albums
Albums produced by Ken Scott
Epic Records albums